Dynamism is a general name for a group of philosophical views concerning the nature of matter. However different they may be in other respects, all these views agree in making matter consist essentially of simple and indivisible units, substances, or forces. Dynamism is sometimes used to denote systems that admit not only matter and extension, but also determinations, tendencies, and forces intrinsic and essential to matter. More properly, however, it means exclusive systems that do away with the dualism of matter and force by reducing the former to the latter. 

The word was coined by Thomas Carlyle, who contrasted dynamism with mechanism.

Leibniz's formulation 

Dynamism is the metaphysics of Gottfried Leibniz (1646–1716) that reconciles hylomorphic substance theory with mechanistic atomism by way of a pre-established harmony, and which was later developed by Christian Wolff (1679–1754) as a metaphysical cosmology. The major thesis for Leibniz follows as a consequences of his monad, that: “the nature of every substance carries a general expression of the whole universe. [The monad provides] the concept of an individual substance that contains...all its phenomena, such that nothing can happen to substance that is not generated from its own ground...but in conformity to what happens to another”... Whereby Leibniz "counters the tendency inherent in Cartesian and Spinozistic rationalism toward an “isolationist” interpretation of the ontological independence of substance... Leibniz's account of substantial force aims to furnish the complete metaphysical groundwork for a science of dynamics".

20th century and contemporary use 
Elements of Dynamism can be found in the works of Henri Bergson, and in more contemporary works, such as the process philosophy of Alfred North Whitehead in terms of relations, as well as the systems theory of Ludwig von Bertalanffy and William Ross Ashby. The Basque philosopher Xavier Zubiri, most notably in his works, "On Essence" and "Dynamic Structure of Reality" details of several dynamisms inherent in the universe, beginning with variation, then onto alteration, selfhood, self-possession, living-together, onto Dynamism as a Mode of Being-in-the-world. It is a response to the Philosophy of Spirit via Hegel in addition to reductionists and Heidegger. This concept also has resonances with the Object-oriented ontology and Speculative Realism schools of philosophy.

References

Gottfried Wilhelm Leibniz
Metaphysical theories